Vidhya Bardan Boarding English School popularly known as VBBES is a private school.

Information
This school lies nearby the District Administration Office of Panchthar. School starts at 10:00 and ends at 04:00. This is one of the school of Phidim Bazar situated in the heart of bazaar also known as Thadoline.

The school was established in 1987 (2044 BS). And claims to give high level of learning.

There are other schools which provide private learning facility like Mechi English boarding school, Balkiran English boarding school, Maya Namula boarding school, etc.

{info}This article is not fully completed{info}
{note}Article under construction{note}

References

Boarding schools in Nepal
Educational institutions established in 1987
Schools in Nepal
1987 establishments in Nepal